Tim or Timothy Evans may refer to:
 Tim Evans (footballer) (born 1953), Australian rules football player
 Tim Evans (British Army officer) (born 1962)
 Tim Evans (rowing) (born 1970), American Olympic rower
 Timothy Evans (1924–1950), Welshman wrongly executed for murder
 Timothy C. Evans (born 1943), American judge

See also
 Tim Rhys-Evans (born c. 1972), Welsh conductor